Rudolf Cejka (16 March 1941 – 11 April 1990) was an Austrian footballer. He played in one match for the Austria national football team in 1965.

References

External links
 
 

1941 births
1990 deaths
Austrian footballers
Austria international footballers
People from Baden District, Austria
Association football defenders
First Vienna FC players